Balderston may refer to:

Places
 Balderston, an alternative spelling of the British village of Balderstone, Lancashire

People
 John Balderston (Cambridge) (died 1719), Master of Emmanuel College, Cambridge
 John L. Balderston (1889–1954), an American playwright and screenwriter
 Kris M. Balderston, managing director of the Global Partnership Initiative and the Deputy Special Representative for Global Partnerships in the Office of the Secretary of State
 Caroline Balderston Parry (born 1945), a Canadian writer, musician, celebrator, and consultant

See also
 Balderstone (disambiguation)